The National Museum of Women in the Arts (NMWA), located in Washington, D.C., is "the first museum in the world solely dedicated" to championing women through the arts. NMWA was incorporated in 1981 by Wallace and Wilhelmina Holladay. Since opening in 1987, the museum has acquired a collection of more than 6,000 works by more than 1,000 artists, ranging from the 16th century to today. The collection includes works by Frida Kahlo, Mary Cassatt, Alma Woodsey Thomas, Élisabeth Louise Vigée-LeBrun, and Amy Sherald. NMWA also holds the only painting by Frida Kahlo in Washington, D.C.

The museum occupies an old Masonic Temple, a building listed on the U.S. National Register of Historic Places. As of August 2021, the museum is temporarily closed as it undergoes a $66 million transformative renovation. The museum will reopen to the public on October 21, 2023.

History
The museum was founded to reform traditional histories of art.  It is dedicated to discovering and making known women artists who have been overlooked, erased, or unacknowledged, and assuring the place of women in contemporary art.  The museum's founder, Wilhelmina Cole Holladay, and her husband Wallace F. Holladay began collecting art in the 1960s, just as scholars were beginning to discuss the under-representation of women in museum collections and major art exhibitions.  Impressed by a 17th-century Flemish still life painting by Clara Peeters that they saw in Europe, they sought out information on Peeters and found that the definitive art history texts referenced neither her nor any other woman artist.  They became committed to collecting artwork by women and eventually to creating a museum and research center.

The National Museum of Women in the Arts was incorporated in December 1981 as a private, non-profit museum, and the Holladay donation became the core of the institution's permanent collection.  After purchasing and extensively renovating a former Masonic Temple, NMWA opened in April 1987 with the inaugural exhibition American Women Artists, 1830–1930.  To underscore its commitment to increasing the attention given to women in all disciplines, NMWA commissioned Pulitzer Prize-winning composer Ellen Taaffe Zwilich to write Concerto for Two Pianos and Orchestra inspired by five paintings from the permanent collection, for an opening concert. 

As of 2022, Director Susan Fisher Sterling heads a staff of more than 50 people.

Building

In 1983, NMWA purchased a landmark  former Masonic temple in the Renaissance Revival style to house its works, under its first director Anne-Imelda Radice. After extensive renovations that included the addition of the two dramatic marble stairways linking the first floor and mezzanine, the museum opened to the public on April 7, 1987. In November 1997, the Elisabeth A. Kasser Wing was opened, adding two new galleries, a larger museum shop, and a reception room.  The entire facility . The entire facility is now 84,110 square feet (7,814 m2). 

The museum closed in August 2021 for a major renovation, with plans to reopen in late 2023. Key improvements include enlarged gallery space, a new destination for researchers and education programs, enhanced amenities and accessibility for visitors as well as infrastructure and storage upgrades to improve the long-term conservation and security of the museum’s collection.

Wilhelmina Cole Holladay

Wilhelmina Cole Holladay was the founder and chair of the Board of the National Museum of Women in the Arts. Since her discovery that women artists have historically been omitted from collegiate art history texts, Wilhelmina Cole Holladay made it her mission to bring to the forefront the accomplishments of women through collecting, exhibiting and researching women artists of all nationalities and time periods.

Holladay created individual committees of over 1,000 volunteers from 27 states and seven countries, to give educational opportunities to children through collaborations with schools and other community groups, as well as provided opportunities for adults to participate and encourage art in local communities across the globe.

Wilhelmina Cole Holladay's interest in art was sparked as a student at Elmira College in New York, where she studied art history, followed by graduate work at the University of Paris.  She is listed in Who's Who of American Women, Who's Who in American Art, Who's Who in the World, and she held many honorary degrees and achievement awards for her work in the arts community. In 2006 she received the National Medal of Arts from the United States and the Légion d'honneur from the French government. In 2007 Holladay received the Gold Medal for the Arts from the National Arts Club in New York City.

Holladay died on March 6, 2021, at her home in Washington, D.C. She was 98.

New York Avenue Sculpture Project

The museum sponsored a series of installations on New York Avenue in Washington, DC from 13th Street to 9th Street, in the heart of Mount Vernon Square. The point of the effort was to bring "character" to an area where "there is a lot of good stuff going on," due to revitalization programs in the neighborhood.

Niki de Saint Phalle's works, four in total, were the first in a series of installations. The installation of de Saint Phalle's iconic pop art works was meant as a contrast to the traditional sculpture that graces the streets and squares of Washington. All five major median strips were made into "sculpture islands," as described by National Museum of Women in the Art's director Susan Fisher Sterling. Another inspiration for the project came from the lack of innovative contemporary art in Washington, encouraging the evolution of the area.

The project was sponsored by Medda Gudelsky, the D.C. Downtown B.I.D., the Philip L. Graham Fund, the Homer and Martha Gudelsky Family Foundation, members of the museum, and the D.C. Department of Transportation.

The works remained up for one year.

Collection

The collection currently contains more than 4,500 works in a variety of styles and media, spanning from the 16th century to present day. Among the earliest works is Lavinia Fontana’s Portrait of a Noblewoman, ca. 1580. There are also a number of special collections, including 18th-century botanical prints, works by British and Irish women silversmiths from the 17th–19th centuries, and more than 1,000 unique and limited edition artists’ books.

Nearly 1,000 artists are represented, including Magdalena Abakanowicz, Lynda Benglis, Rosa Bonheur, Chakaia Booker, Louise Bourgeois, Lola Alvarez Bravo, Rosalba Carriera, Mary Cassatt, Elizabeth Catlett, Judy Chicago, Camille Claudel, Louisa Courtauld, Petah Coyne, Louise Dahl-Wolfe, Elaine de Kooning, Lesley Dill, Helen Frankenthaler, Sonia Gechtoff, Marguerite Gérard, Nan Goldin, Nancy Graves, Grace Hartigan, Frida Kahlo, Angelica Kauffman, Käthe Kollwitz, Lee Krasner, Justine Kurland, Bettye Lane, Marie Laurencin, Hung Liu, Judith Leyster, Maria Martinez, Maria Sibylla Merian, Joan Mitchell, Gabriele Münter, Elizabeth Murray, Alice Neel, Louise Nevelson, Sarah Miriam Peale, Clara Peeters, Lilla Cabot Perry, Jaune Quick-to-See Smith, Rachel Ruysch, Elisabetta Sirani, Joan Snyder, Lilly Martin Spencer, Alma Thomas, Suzanne Valadon, Amy Sherald, and Élisabeth-Louise Vigée-Le Brun.

Betty Boyd Dettre Library and Research Center 
The Betty Boyd Dettre Library and Research Center (LRC) provides researchers with information about women visual artists from all time periods and nationalities. It is open to scholars, students, researchers, curators, museum professionals, and the general public. The LRC collection includes 18,500 volumes of books and exhibition catalogues, 50 periodical titles, and research files on 18,000 individual women artists. These files include resumes, correspondence, reproductions, articles, and other ephemeral materials. The Arts and Entertainment Network Media Library holds approximately 500 videos, DVDs, audio tapes, and other audiovisual materials, including examples of video art, interviews with women artists, documentaries, and films directed by women.

Also available to researchers are The Nelleke Nix and Marianne Huber Collection: The Frida Kahlo Papers consists of more than 360 unpublished letters, postcards, notes, clippings, printed matter, and drawings relating to the artist's life and work. The LRC also holds artist Judy Chicago’s visual archives.

In spring 2007, the LRC launched "Clara: Database of Women Artists," a user-friendly searchable interface for biographic information on close to 18,000 historic and contemporary women artists from around the world. Since integrated within the NMWA web site, Clara has been decommissioned and is in the process of being moved.

Exhibitions
Beginning in 1987 with American Women Artists, 1830–1930, NMWA has presented more than 200 exhibitions, including:

 Sonya Clark: Tatter, Bristle, and Mend (3/3/2021–6/27/2021)
 Judy Chicago—The End: A Meditation on Death and Extinction (9/19/2019–1/20/2020)
 Rodarte (11/10/2018–2/10/2019)
 Women House (3/9/2018–5/28/2018)
 Magnetic Fields: Expanding American Abstraction, 1960s to Today (10/13/2017–1/21/2018)
 She Who Tells a Story: Women Photographers from Iran and the Arab World (4/8/2016–7/31/2016)
 Picturing Mary: Woman, Mother, Idea (12/5/2014–4/12/2015)
 Royalists to Romantics: Women Artists from the Louvre, Versailles, and Other French National Collections (2/24/2012–7/29/2012)
 Women Who Rock: Vision, Passion, Power (9/7/2012–1/6/2013)
 Loïs Mailou Jones: A Life in Vibrant Color (10/9/2010–1/9/2011)
 WACK! Art and the Feminist Revolution (9/21/2007–12/16/2007)
 Dreaming Their Way: Australian Aboriginal Women (6/30/2006–9/24/2006)
 An Imperial Collection: Women Artists from the State Hermitage Museum (2/14/ 2003 – 6/18/2003)
 Places of Their Own: Emily Carr, Georgia O'Keeffe, and Frida Kahlo (2/8/2002–5/12/2002)
 Julie Taymor: Playing With Fire (11/16/2000–2/4/2001)
 The Magic of Remedios Varo (2/10/2000–5/29/2000)   
 Women to Watch (ongoing) 
The Women to Watch exhibition series is a collaboration between NMWA and its national and international committees. These exhibitions, which take place every few years, feature artists from the committees' regions and focus on a specific medium or theme chosen by NMWA’s curators.

Public programs

The museum presents public programs including hands-on workshops, artist conversations, gallery talks, art history lectures, and tours. 

NMWA offers arts-integration teacher training through its Art, Books, and Creativity (ABC) curriculum.

The museum's Women, Arts, and Social Change (WASC) initiative aims to facilitate conversations about social and political issues affecting women. The initiative's Fresh Talk series invites the public to converse with women in the arts as well as other fields.

Outreach committees 
The museum created its network of national and international committees in 1984. As of 2022, there are 28 outreach committees with over 3,000 members in the United States and around the world. 

The committees promote the museum’s mission, advocate for regional women artists, and serve as NMWA ambassadors. 

The committees help to present the museum's Women to Watch exhibition series which features emerging or underrepresented artists from the states and countries where committees exist.

2021-2023 renovations 
As of August 2021, the museum is temporarily closed as it undergoes a $66 million renovation. The museum will reopen to the public on October 21, 2023.

Operations
The museum is located at 1250 New York Avenue and H Street N.W. The closest Washington Metro stations are Metro Center or McPherson Square stations. Prior to the 2021-2023 renovation project, the museum was open Monday–Saturday 10 a.m.–5 p.m. and Sundays noon–5 p.m. Admission was $10 for adults, $8 for students and visitors 65 and over, and free for members and visitors 18 and under. Admission was free to all on the first Sunday of every month. The museum shop shares the same hours as the museum.

See also
 House of the Temple, another Masonic Temple building on 16th Street, nearby
 New Hall Art Collection
 Women artists

References

External links
Official website
Virtual tour of the National Museum of Women in the Arts provided by Google Arts & Culture

Art museums and galleries in Washington, D.C.
Women and the arts
Women's museums in the United States
Members of the Cultural Alliance of Greater Washington
Neoclassical architecture in Washington, D.C.
Cultural infrastructure completed in 1903
Art museums established in 1987
1987 establishments in Washington, D.C.
Women in Washington, D.C.
Former Masonic buildings in Washington, D.C.
Penn Quarter